Poor Relief Act (with its variations) is a stock short title used in the United Kingdom for legislation relating to poor relief.

List
The Poor Relief Act 1601
The Poor Relief Act 1662
The Poor Relief Act 1691

The Poor Relief (Ireland) Acts 1838 to 1892 is the collective title of the following Acts:
The Poor Relief (Ireland) Act 1838 (1 & 2 Vict c 56)
The Poor Relief (Ireland) Act 1839 (2 & 3 Vict c 1)
The Poor Relief (Ireland) Act 1843 (6 & 7 Vict c 92)
The Poor Relief (Ireland) Act 1847 (10 & 11 Vict c 31)
The Poor Relief (Ireland) (No. 2) Act 1847 (10 & 11 Vict c 90)
The Poor Relief (Ireland) Act 1848 (11 & 12 Vict c 25)
The Guardians (Ireland) Act 1849 (12 & 13 Vict c 4)
The Poor Relief (Ireland) Act 1849 (12 & 13 Vict c 104)
The Poor Relief (Ireland) Act 1851 (14 & 15 Vict c 68)
The Poor Relief (Ireland) Act 1862 (25 & 26 Vict c 83)
The Poor Persons Burial (Ireland) Act 1866 (29 & 30 Vict c 38)
The Poor Law Inspectors (Ireland) Act 1868 (31 & 32 Vict c 74)
The Poor Relief (Ireland) Act 1869 (32 & 33 Vict c 54)
The Pauper Children (Ireland) Act 1876 (39 & 40 Vict c 38)
The Poor Law Rating (Ireland) Act 1876 (39 & 40 Vict c 50)
The Poor Afflicted Person Relief (Ireland) Act 1878 (41 & 42 Vict c 60)
Sections 1 and 9 of the Poor Law Act 1889 (52 & 53 Vict c 56)
The Poor Law Acts (Ireland) Amendment Act 1890 (53 & 54 Vict c 30)
The Poor Law (Ireland) Act 1892 (55 & 56 Vict c 5)
The Boards of Management of Poor Law District Schools (Ireland) Act 1892 (55 & 56 Vict c 41)

See also
List of short titles

References

Lists of legislation by short title and collective title